Baeopogon is a genus of passerine birds in the bulbul family, Pycnonotidae.

Taxonomy
The genus Baeopogon was introduced in 1860 by the German ornithologist Ferdinand Heine with the honeyguide greenbul as the type species. The name combines the Ancient Greek baios (βαιός) meaning "small" or "little" with pōgōn meaning "beard".

The genus contains two species:
 Honeyguide greenbul (Baeopogon indicator)
 Sjöstedt's greenbul (Baeopogon clamans)

References

 
Greenbuls
Bird genera
 
Taxonomy articles created by Polbot